Periodic tryptophan protein 2 homolog is a protein that in humans is encoded by the PWP2 gene.

References

Further reading